Cuneo (Italian), or Coni (Piedmontese), is a province in the southwest of the Piedmont region of Italy. To the west it borders on the French region of Provence-Alpes-Côte d'Azur (departments of Alpes-Maritimes, Alpes-de-Haute-Provence and Hautes-Alpes). To the north it borders with the Metropolitan City of Turin. To the east it borders with the province of Asti. To the south it borders with the Ligurian provinces of Savona and Imperia. It is also known as La Provincia Granda, Piedmontese for "The Big Province", because it is the fourth-largest province in Italy (following the provinces of Sassari, South Tyrol and Foggia) and the largest one in Piedmont. Briga Marittima and Tenda were part of this province before cession to France in 1947.

Administration
Its capital is the city of Cuneo. Of the 250 comuni in the province, the largest by population are:

Economy 

Companies active in the province include:
 Michelis in Mondovì
 Miroglio in Alba
 Ferrero SpA in Alba
 Maina in Fossano
 Balocco in Fossano
 Merlo in San Defendente (Cervasca)
 Arpa industriale in Bra
 Bottero in Cuneo
 Mondo in Alba
 Mtm-Brc in Cherasco
 Abet in Bra
 Edizioni San Paolo in Alba

Many important industrial groups have branches in the province: Michelin (Cuneo and Fossano), Saint-Gobain (Savigliano), Valeo (Mondovì), Asahi Glass Co. (Cuneo), ITT (Barge), Diageo (Santa Vittoria d'Alba) and Nestlé (Moretta).

Cuneo is also the land of important wines, mostly produced in the Langhe and Roero hills, such as Barbaresco, Barolo, Nebbiolo, Barbera and many others.

See also 

 List of municipalities of the Province of Cuneo
 Piemonte (wine)

References

Sources

 
 
 
 

 
Cuneo